Chan Yung-jan and Martina Hingis defeated Lucie Hradecká and Kateřina Siniaková in the final, 6–3, 6–2 to win the women's doubles tennis title at the 2017 US Open. It was their first Grand Slam title together, and their seventh title overall, all in 2017.

Bethanie Mattek-Sands and Lucie Šafářová were the reigning champions, but Mattek-Sands was unable to compete due to injury. Šafářová played alongside Barbora Strýcová, but lost in the semifinals to Hradecká and Siniaková.

Seeds

Draw

Finals

Top half

Section 1

Section 2

Bottom half

Section 3

Section 4

References

External links
 Women's Doubles Main Draw
2017 US Open – Women's draws and results at the International Tennis Federation

Women's Doubles
US Open - Women's Doubles
US Open (tennis) by year – Women's doubles
2017 in American women's sports